Marguerite Béclard d'Harcourt (24 February 1884 – 2 August 1964) was a French composer and ethno-musicologist. She was born in Paris and studied composition at the Schola Cantorum with Abel Decaux, Vincent d'Indy and Maurice Emmanuel. 
 
She married ethnologist Raoul d'Harcourt and afterward researched South American and Canadian folk music, publishing texts in collaboration with him. She also collected and published folk melodies from Ecuador, Peru, Bolivia and other countries in standard European notation. She died in Paris.

Works
Selected works include:
Fifty popular Indian Melodies, 1923
Raimi, or the Feast of the sun, ballet, 1926
3 Sonnets from the Renaissance, 1930
String Quartet, 1930
Three symphonic movements, 1932
Children in the pen, melodies, 1934–1935
Twenty-four Folk Songs of Old Quebec, 1936
Sonata Three, 1938
Dierdane, lyric drama, 1937–1941
Sonatine for flute and piano, 1946
The Seasons, 2nd symphony, 1951–1952

Writings with Raoul d'Harcourt include:
Music of the Incas and its survivals, Paris, P. Geuthner, 1925
French folk songs of Canada: their musical language, Paris, PUF, 1956

References

1884 births
1964 deaths
20th-century classical composers
French music educators
French classical composers
French women classical composers
Pupils of Vincent d'Indy
Musicians from Paris
French ethnomusicologists
Pupils of Maurice Emmanuel
Schola Cantorum de Paris alumni
20th-century French women musicians
20th-century French composers
20th-century French musicologists
Women music educators
French women anthropologists
20th-century women composers